This is a list of major social gaming networks.

The list is not exhaustive and is limited to notable, well-known services.

Discontinued services

References

Social networking websites